E. C. Mobley (born 1839/40) was a lawyer and member of the Texas House of Representatives from January 11, 1881 to August 3, 1881. He defeated Hal Geiger who was seeking re-election in Robertson County, Texas in 1881. Mobley resigned his office when he moved out of the district. Geiger won the special election to replace him. He was a lawyer and a Democrat.  Originally from Georgia, he was listed as 42 years old in 1881.

See also
African-American officeholders during and following the Reconstruction era

References

Members of the Texas House of Representatives
1830s births
Year of birth uncertain
Year of death missing
1840s births
19th-century American politicians